Wild China is a six-part nature documentary series on the natural history of China, co-produced by the BBC Natural History Unit and China Central Television (CCTV) and filmed in high-definition (HD). It was screened in the UK on BBC Two from 11 May to 5 June 2008. The English narration was provided by Bernard Hill and the series produced by Phil Chapman for the BBC and Gao Xiaoping for CCTV. The Chinese version was broadcast under the title Beautiful China. In Canada, it was broadcast on CBC as part of the series The Nature of Things narrated by David Suzuki. Wild China was broadcast in Australia on ABC1 and ABC HD each Sunday at 7:30pm from 18 May 2008.

The musical score to accompany the series was composed by Barnaby Taylor and was performed by Cheng Yu and the UK Chinese Ensemble.

The series was billed as the culmination of the BBC Natural History Unit's "Continents" programmes, a long-running strand of blue-chip wildlife documentaries which surveyed the natural history of each of the world's major land areas. It was preceded by Wild Caribbean in 2007, but with the broadcast of South Pacific in 2009 the BBC signalled a continuation of the strand.

Production details 

The 2008 Beijing Olympics gave the BBC Natural History Unit team the opportunity to make the first comprehensive series on China's natural history. In the run up to the Games, the Chinese government was "understandably keen to promote itself as a country worth visiting" according to BBC producer Phil Chapman. Permission for Wild China was granted in 2005, with the BBC working alongside local partners CTV, a Beijing production company closely allied to state broadcaster CCTV. The series marks the first time that CCTV has collaborated with a foreign broadcaster.

With wildlife filmmaking in its infancy in China, and a perception in the developed world of a country plagued by environmental problems, the producers hoped that the series would change attitudes in both the East and the West:

Filming for the series took place over 16 months, and involved half a million miles of travel on 57 separate filming trips to some of China's most inaccessible and spectacular locations. The production team shot over 500 hours of HD footage in 26 of China's 30 provinces.

Despite being granted unprecedented access to many remote and protected areas, one of the main challenges faced by the filmmakers was finding wildlife. Although 15% of China's territory has some form of protection, this is not a guarantee of safety for wildlife, as reserves were often found to be under-equipped and under-staffed. In addition, they encountered a lack of local expertise and specialist knowledge, as few of China's zoologists were naturalists with an interest in observing wildlife. Producers even struggled to film the courting behaviour of one of the country's commonest creatures, the rice-paddy frog. Consequently, the team's attempts to find and film wildlife were not always successful.

With the support of local party officials, the producers found it easier to contact and film local people. They were particularly keen to record examples of traditional lifestyles which incorporate the natural world to give the series a cultural context. The episodes were divided by region to present the distinct cultural as well as ecological differences.

Filming techniques 

Over 80% of the series was based on traditional observational techniques in the wild. These were conducted in some of China's most remote areas:

 Apart from a handful of biologists, the Wild China team were the first to set foot in Tibet’s remote Chang Tang reserve for almost 100 years. After a five-day drive from Lhasa, they were faced with the challenge of filming rutting chiru in temperatures of -30°C at 5,000m above sea level. The sequence showing a duel between two rival males was successfully filmed after stalking the herds for seven days. Field producer Jeff Boedeker trained with his team for a month in various stealth techniques. On one occasion the field team lay under a white tarp for 32 hours waiting for a shot that never came. They burned yak dung to stay warm and melt drinking water, and the crew was specifically selected for its sensibility to cultures, mental and physical aptitude for high stress scenarios, and techniques in nonfiction filmmaking.  
 After two unsuccessful attempts to film wild giant pandas in the Qinling Mountains, the producers switched to a different part of the region, the little-visited Changqing Reserve. There they were able to track and film the creatures in winter, and also film courtship and mating activity, the first time such a complete sequence has been shot in the wild.
 Producer Kathryn Jeffs and cameraman Paul Stewart travelled to the remote Gaoligongshan mountains in western Yunnan and after a three-hour trek to a ridge overlooking the forest, managed to film a troop of bear macaques feeding on fruits in the canopy. A second sequence showing white-eared pheasants at a rarely seen lek was ruined when the birds were disturbed.

Certain sequences could only be filmed using special techniques:

 High speed cameras were used to slow down the action 80 times to show a songbird evading the lunge of a Pallas' pit viper on Shedao Island.
 A time-lapse sequence of a remote Tibetan gorge was filmed using still images taken at intervals after the main filming camera broke down.
 Infrared lighting enabled the team to film Francois langurs and bamboo bats covertly.
 Thermal imaging cameras were used to show how the elephant yam uses convection heating at night to distribute its distinctive smell, which attracts pollinating beetles.

In some circumstances behaviour was too difficult to obtain in the wild, and controlled conditions were required:

 Bamboo rats and Roborovski hamsters were filmed in burrows with glass side panels in a studio set.
 The producers negotiated an agreement to take Chinese alligator eggs from an incubator at the Xuancheng breeding centre and place them in an artificial nest to film them hatching.
 The courtship display of Temminck's tragopans was filmed using a captive pair of birds habituated to the presence of humans. Hunting pressure has made the wild birds in Yunnan too wary to approach.
 The slowed-down images of jumping spiders on Everest could not be filmed in the wild due to the impracticality of transporting high-speed camera equipment to the remote location, so a closely related species was filmed in a studio set.

Episodes

Merchandise 
A Blu-ray Disc, DVD and book have been released to accompany the TV series:

 The Blu-ray Disc (BBCBD0025), released on 5 August 2008, presents the series in full high-definition format. The series is also included in the BBC High Definition Natural History Collection Blu-ray box sets for Regions A and B (BBCBD0056).
 A Region 2, 2-disc DVD set (BBCDVD2146) featuring all six full-length episodes was released on 9 June 2008. The Region 4 version of the DVD and Blu-ray was released by ABC DVD/Village Roadshow on 1 July 2008.
 The accompanying paperback book, Wild China: The Hidden Wonders of the World's Most Enigmatic Land by series producer Phil Chapman, was published by BBC Books on 8 May 2008.

See also
 Japan: Earth's Enchanted Islands

References

External links
 
 
 

National Geographic (American TV channel) original programming
BBC television documentaries
Documentary films about nature
BBC high definition shows
2008 British television series debuts
2008 British television series endings
Television series about China